George Robbins Robbins (September 24, 1808 – February 22, 1875) was an American Opposition Party/Republican Party politician who represented New Jersey's 2nd congressional district in the United States House of Representatives for two terms from 1855 to 1859.

Early life and career
Robbins was born in Allentown, New Jersey on September 24, 1808. He received a good literary education, and was graduated from the Jefferson Medical College at Philadelphia in 1837, and commenced the practice of medicine in Fallsington, Pennsylvania (Bucks County, Pennsylvania). He moved to Hamilton Square, New Jersey (in Hamilton Township, Mercer County, New Jersey) the same year and continued the practice of medicine.

Congress
Robbins was elected as an Opposition Party candidate to the Thirty-fourth Congress and reelected as a Republican to the Thirty-fifth Congress, serving in office from March 4, 1855 to March 3, 1859, but was not a candidate for renomination in 1858 to the Thirty-sixth Congress.

Death
After leaving Congress, he resumed the practice of his profession. He died in Hamilton Square on February 22, 1875, and was interred in the Presbyterian Church Cemetery.

External links

George Robbins Robbins at The Political Graveyard

1808 births
1875 deaths
People from Allentown, New Jersey
Opposition Party members of the United States House of Representatives from New Jersey
New Jersey Oppositionists
Republican Party members of the United States House of Representatives from New Jersey
Physicians from New Jersey
People from Hamilton Township, Mercer County, New Jersey
Thomas Jefferson University alumni
19th-century American politicians